The Africa Movie Academy Award for Best Diaspora Documentary is an annual merit by the Africa Film Academy to reward the best diaspora documentaries for the year. Prior to the creation of the category in 2011, diaspora documentaries submitted normally compete with African documentaries for the Best Documentary category.

References

Lists of award winners
Africa Movie Academy Awards
Documentary film awards
Culture of the African diaspora